Goodenia pallida is a species of flowering plant in the family Goodeniaceae and is endemic to a restricted area in the extreme west of Western Australia. It is an erect herb covered with simple and glandular hairs, and with narrow elliptic stem leaves and racemes of pale purple flowers.

Description
Flowering occurs around August and the fruit is a more or less spherical capsule  in diameter.

Taxonomy and naming
Goodenia pallida was first formally described in 1990 Roger Charles Carolin in the journal Telopea from a specimen he collected on the road between Onslow and Roeburne in 1970. The specific epithet (pallida) means "pale", referring to the colour of the petals.

Distribution and habitat
This goodenia grows in grassy woodland and is only known from the type location.

Conservation status
Goodenia pallida is classified as "Priority One" by the Government of Western Australia Department of Parks and Wildlife, meaning that it is known from only one or a few locations which are potentially at risk.

References

pallida
Eudicots of Western Australia
Plants described in 1990
Taxa named by Roger Charles Carolin
Endemic flora of Australia